The La Mouette Top Model is a French high-wing, single-place, hang glider that was designed and produced by La Mouette.

Design and development
The Top Model was designed as a competition glider and built in one size. It is no longer in production.

The aircraft structure is made from tubing, with the wing covered in Dacron sailcloth.

Specifications (Top Model)

References

Top Model
Hang gliders